Founded in 1974 as Radio Wansbeck, Northumberland Hospital Radio (NHR) is a regionally-based hospital broadcasting service covering the county of Northumberland and North Tyneside District. NHR provides a 24-hour service to over 1000 beds across six hospitals: Alnwick Infirmary, Blyth Community Hospital, Hexham General Hospital, North Tyneside General Hospital, Northumbria Specialist Emergency Care Hospital in Cramlington and Wansbeck General Hospital in Ashington - Hospitals within the Northumbria Healthcare NHS Foundation Trust - one of the largest NHS Trusts in the UK.

It is run by entirely by unpaid volunteers and funded through grants and donations. NHR is a registered UK charity.

In 2014, NHR celebrated 40 years of broadcasting. The Charity does not broadcast online, preferring to concentrate on providing a dedicated service to hospital inpatients and staff. 

Hospital radio stations